Easby Abbey, or the Abbey of St Agatha, is a ruined Premonstratensian abbey on the eastern bank of the River Swale on the outskirts of Richmond in the Richmondshire district of North Yorkshire, England. The site is privately owned but maintained by English Heritage and can be reached by a riverside walk from Richmond Castle. Within the precinct is the still-active parish church, displaying 13th-century wall paintings.

History
The Abbey of St Agatha, Easby, was founded in 1152 by Roald, Constable of Richmond Castle. The inhabitants were canons rather than monks. The Premonstratensians wore a white habit and became known as the White Canons. Easby was a daughter house of the Abbey of St Mary and St Martial (Newsham Abbey) in Lincolnshire; it was the third Premonstratensian house funded in England. 

The White Canons followed a code of austerity similar to that of Cistercian monks. Unlike monks of other orders, they were exempt from episcopal discipline. They undertook preaching and pastoral work in the region (such as distributing meat and drink). The canons also raised sheep.

Other former Premonstraterian houses in the north of England include Egglestone Abbey in County Durham and Shap Abbey in Cumbria. Like most northern monasteries, Easby suffered from frequent Scottish raids during the Middle Ages. Great damage was caused to Easby and Egglestone Abbey in 1346 when the English army was billeted there on its way to the Battle of Neville's Cross.

In the late 1530s Henry VIII dissolved the monasteries. The abbey was abandoned and left to fall into ruins, though some of the best features were salvaged: the fine canopied choir stalls are now found in Richmond parish church.

The ruins are now Grade I listed.

Picture gallery of Easby Abbey

St Agatha's Church (Easby Church)

St Agatha’s Church is part of the Anglican Parish of Easby, Skeeby, Brompton on Swale, and Bolton on Swale; part of the Richmond Deanery in The Diocese of Leeds.

St Agatha’s Church (also called Easby Church) is located outside of Richmond, Yorkshire, and can easily be reached from Richmond via the trail alongside the river. The exact foundation date of Easby Church is unknown, but it is thought to predate the neighbouring abbey. Little of the original church remains. St Agatha’s retains medieval frescoes that were preserved through the Reformation after being whitewashed. The church and abbey are open free of charge to the public.

In Easby Church is a plaster replica of the carved stone Easby Cross. The original, which dates from the late 8th or early 9th century, is now in the Victoria and Albert Museum. The survival of this extremely rare early Christian cross is remarkable because when the church was being renovated the cross was broken up and used as convenient building stone in the new church. It was preserved there until it was found in the wall of the church and reassembled in the 20th century.

The church is now Grade I listed.

Picture gallery of St Agatha's Church

Burials
Henry le Scrope was buried at the Abbey
William le Scrope (son of Henry), who was a soldier who distinguished himself in the French and Scottish wars (also buried at the Abbey)
Richard le Scrope, 1st Baron Scrope of Bolton was buried at the Abbey in 1403.
Roger Scrope, 2nd Baron Scrope of Bolton, also buried at the Abbey
Richard Scrope, 3rd Baron Scrope of Bolton
Henry Scrope, 4th Baron Scrope of Bolton
John Scrope, 5th Baron Scrope of Bolton

See also
List of monastic houses in North Yorkshire
List of monastic houses in England

References

Churches in North Yorkshire
English Heritage sites in North Yorkshire
History of North Yorkshire
Monasteries in North Yorkshire
Premonstratensian monasteries in England
Ruins in North Yorkshire
Tourist attractions in North Yorkshire
Religious organizations established in the 1150s
Christian monasteries established in the 12th century
Richmond, North Yorkshire
1152 establishments in England
Ruined abbeys and monasteries
Grade I listed buildings in North Yorkshire
Monasteries dissolved under the English Reformation